Yosgart Ernesto Gutiérrez Serna (born 15 March 1981) is a Mexican former professional footballer who played as a goalkeeper.

Career
In the Clausura 2008 tournament, first-choice goalkeeper Óscar Pérez had fallen out of favor with the team due to his lack of consistency, which costed him the starting position. Gutierrez began to assume the role of the first choice goalkeeper for Cruz Azul from then on. In his first season as first-choice, Cruz Azul made it to the finals, losing to Santos Laguna and Santos only conceded 12 goals in 13 games. Although he debuted for the first team in 2008, he was already over 30 years old and was under Pérez's shadow for five years as he was signed into the club in 2003. Once Perez left the team, he was the alternative for José de Jesús Corona for Cruz Azul as Pérez would go on to play with Necaxa. On May 15 during the 2011 Clausura tournament, Cruz Azul's original starting goalkeeper Jose de Jesus Corona engaged in a fight during the second leg in the semifinal between Monarcas Morelia and Cruz Azul which got him suspended for violent conduct. As a result, José de Jesus Corona did not play the first six games in the 2011 Apertura season. Gutiérrez took over the starting spot.

On 16 December 2015, Gutiérrez signed with Necaxa in a season-long loan deal.

Honours
Necaxa
Copa MX: Clausura 2018
Supercopa MX: 2018

References

External links

1981 births
Living people
Mexican footballers
Association football goalkeepers
Cruz Azul footballers
Atlante F.C. footballers
Club Universidad Nacional footballers
Club Necaxa footballers
Liga MX players
Ascenso MX players
Footballers from Sinaloa
People from Guasave